Manono I was a Hawaiian High Chiefess.

She was a daughter of Alapainui and Chiefess Kamakaʻīmoku. Manono was a granddaughter of Chiefess Kalanikauleleiaiwi of Hawaiʻi and niece of chief Haae-a-Mahi.

Manono married her half-brother Keōua and bore him a daughter Kiʻilaweau.

Manono was a grandmother of Keaoua Kekuaokalani.

References

Hawaiian chiefesses